Lindley SH is a sub place north of Johannesburg, South Africa.

The acronym SH in the title means "small holdings" (farming sub units mainly for agricultural use).

It is located adjacent to Lanseria International Airport and Diepsloot, on the banks of the Crocodile River. The R512 and R540 roads intersect the area.

References

Populated places in the Mogale City Local Municipality